Stephen Wong Ka-Lok (born 14 December 1978) is a Hong Kong actor previously contracted to TVB.

Biography
Prior to joining TVB, Wong wanted to be a customs officer.

Wong went on to work in a telecommunication company. He possessed a very good learning attitude and was seen as a very down-to-earth person. During his stint in the telecommunication company, he has constantly been on the look out for opportunity to take up study courses offered by the company, in the quest of upgrading himself. However, as he has only been working there for two years at that time, he was not entitled for such privilege.
 
Wong went to the Television Broadcasts Limited (TVB) Station to perform inspection on its telephone systems, he was approached by a personnel of the acting division. Asked if he is interested in being an actor, Wong first thought was how tough life as an artist would be (he has been on modelling jobs at that time and so had some ideas of such a lifestyle). However, he has some time for consideration and only made his decision after seeking advice from friends and family. Upon casting, he joined the 17th TVB Acting Class. 

After joining TVB, Wong had played supporting roles in numerous television dramas. In December 2022, Wong’s contract with TVB ended.

Theatre
 Love's Labour's Won (才子亂點俏佳人) (2010)

Filmography

Films 
 Super Models (2015)
 The Seventh Lie (2014)
 Badges of Fury (2013)
 Will You Still Love Me Tomorrow? (2013)
 Nightfall (2012)
 Choy Lee Fut (蔡李佛) (2011)
 Forgive and Forget (亲愛的) (2008)
 L For Love♥ L For Lies (我的最愛) (2008)

Dubbing 

 Dub of War's Second Season Graduation Project- Spider-Man: No Way Home (2022) - News anchor and Couch Wilson

TV dramas

References

External links
 樂隨心寫(Stephen's Blog)
 黃嘉樂微博 (Stephen's Micro Blog on Sina)
 樂隨心寫(Stephen's Blog @ Blogger - ceased operation as of 31st Dec 2008 but contents maintained)
 內地新浪網誌(Stephen's Sina Blog catering for mainland China access)
 TVB.COM Profile Page

Living people
1978 births
TVB actors